The 2008 congressional elections in Washington was held on November 4, 2008 to determine who will represent the state of Washington in the United States House of Representatives. Representatives are elected for two-year terms; those elected will serve in the 111th Congress from January 4, 2009 until January 3, 2011. The election coincided with the 2008 U.S. presidential election. Nonpartisan blanket primary elections were held on August 19, 2008. 

Washington has nine seats in the House, apportioned according to the 2000 United States Census. Its 2007-2008 congressional delegation consisted of six Democrats and three Republicans.

All of the incumbents were re-elected, with only the 8th district race being considered competitive.

District 1

Incumbent Democrat Jay Inslee has represented the 1st district in Congress since 1999. Inslee won in the 2006 election with 68% of the vote. He was opposed by Republican candidate Larry Ishmael.

Primary results

General election

District 2

Incumbent Democrat Rick Larsen has represented the 2nd district in Congress since 2001. Larsen won in the 2006 election with 64% of the vote. He was opposed by Republican candidate Rick Bart. Two other Democrats challenged the two in the primary election, Doug Schaffer and Glen Johnson.

Primary results

General election

District 3

Incumbent Democrat Brian Baird has represented the 3rd district in Congress since 1999. Baird won in the 2006 election with 63% of the vote. He was opposed by Republican candidate Michael Delavar. Democrat Cheryl Crist and Republican Christine Webb also entered the primary.

Primary results

General election

District 4

Incumbent Republican Doc Hastings has represented the 4th district in Congress since 1995. Hastings won in the 2006 election with 60% of the vote. He was opposed by Democratic candidate George Fearing. Republican Gordon Allen Pross was eliminated in the primary.

Primary results

General election

District 5

Incumbent Republican Cathy McMorris Rodgers has represented the 2nd district in Congress since 2005. Rodgers was elected in 2006 with 56% of the vote. She was opposed by Democratic candidate Mark Mays. Barbara Lampert of the Democratic party, Republican Kurt Erickson, Libertarian John Beck and Constitution candidate Randall Yearout were eliminated in the primary.

Primary results

General election

District 6

Incumbent Democrat Norm Dicks has represented the 6th district in Congress since 1977. Dicks won in the 2006 election with 71% of the vote. He was opposed by Republican candidate Doug Cloud. Green candidate Gary Murrell and Democrat Paul Richmond also entered the primary.

Primary results

General election

District 7

Incumbent Democrat Jim McDermott has represented the 7th district in Congress since 1989. McDermott won in the 2006 election with 79% of the vote in the most Democratic district in the state. He was opposed by Republican candidate Steve Beren. Democrats Donovan Rivers and Goodspaceguy entered the primary, as well as independents Mark Goldman and Al Schaefer.

Primary results

General election

District 8

Incumbent Republican Dave Reichert has represented the 8th district in Congress since 2005. Reichert won in the 2006 election with 51.5% of the vote. He was opposed by Democratic candidate Darcy Burner. The primary also included Democrats James Vaughn and Keith Arnold, and Independents Richard Todd and Boleslaw Orlinski.

The District 8 race was considered competitive: it voted for Obama by a large margin and had a Cook PVI of D+2. It was rated "toss up" by Cook, "no clear favorite" by CQ Politics and "toss up/tilt Republican" by Rothenberg.

Primary results

General election

District 9

Incumbent Democrat Adam Smith has represented the 9th district in Congress since 1997. Smith won in the 2006 election with 66% of the vote. He was opposed by Republican candidate James Postma.

Primary results

General election

References

External links
Elections from the Washington Secretary of State
 
Map of districts
U.S. Congress candidates for Washington at Project Vote Smart
Washington U.S. House Races from 2008 Race Tracker
Campaign contributions for Washington congressional races from OpenSecrets
NWProgressive Institute blog on candidates
 

2008
Washington
United States House of Representatives